Daniel Bader discusses two forms of psychological determinism:
 Orectic psychological determinism is the view that we always act upon our greatest drive. This is often called psychological hedonism, and if the drive is specified for self-interest: psychological egoism.
 Rational psychological determinism claims that we always act according to our "strongest" or "best" reason.

See also
Amoralism
Determinism
Empathy
Free will
Moral skepticism

References

External links
 http://www.utilitarianism.com/psychohed.htm

Motivational theories
Determinism